The Faschivska coal mine is a large coal mine located in the south-east of Ukraine in Luhansk Oblast. Faschivska represents one of the largest coal reserves in Ukraine having estimated reserves of 12.9 million tonnes. The annual coal production is around 285,000 tonnes.

See also 

 Coal in Ukraine
 List of mines in Ukraine

References 

Coal mines in Ukraine
Economy of Luhansk Oblast
Coal mines in the Soviet Union